Pedro Aranda-Díaz Muñoz (29 June 1933 – 11 November 2018) was a Mexican Catholic archbishop.

Biography 
Aranda-Díaz Muñoz was born in León, Guanajuato, and was ordained to the priesthood in 1956. He served as bishop of the Roman Catholic Archdiocese of Tulancingo in Mexico from 1975 to 2006 and then as archbishop of the Tulancingo Archdiocese from 2006 to 2008.

Notes

1933 births
2018 deaths
21st-century Roman Catholic archbishops in Mexico
Roman Catholic archbishops of Tulancingo
Mexican Roman Catholic archbishops